The Gippsland languages are a family of Pama–Nyungan languages of Australia. They were spoken in the Gippsland region, the southernmost part of mainland Australia, on the Bass Strait. There are three rather distant branches; these are often considered single languages, though the dialects of Gaanay are sometimes counted separately:
Gaanay (Kurnai): Muk-thang, Nulit, Thangquai, Bidhawal
Dhudhuroa
Pallanganmiddang
All are now extinct.
The Gippsland languages, especially Gaanay, have phonotactics that are unusual for mainland Australian languages, but characteristic of Tasmanian languages.

References